Ryan Harrington (born 19 August 1990) is an English professional darts player from Essex. He is the son of former darts player Rod Harrington.

Career
He qualified for the 2015 UK Open in 56th on the UK Open order of merit so started in the second round. He beat Matt Padgett 5–0 in the second round but lost 6–9 to Dave Chisnall in the third round. He qualified for the 2016 UK Open where he reached the last 64 again after wins over Glen McGrandle and Darron Brown, before losing to eventual winner Michael van Gerwen. Harrington got a Tour Card after he finished fourth in the UK Q School Order of Merit in January 2018.

In November 2019, he qualified for the 2019 Grand Slam of Darts. He reached the last 16 but lost 10-3 against Dave Chisnall.

See also
 List of players with a 2018 PDC Tour Card

References

English darts players
Living people
1990 births
Sportspeople from Chelmsford
Professional Darts Corporation former tour card holders